Elisaveta is a name that may refer to:

 Elisaveta Bagriana
 Elisaveta Belogradskaya
 Elisaveta Bem
 Elisaveta Bykova
 Elisaveta Dmitrieva
 Elisaveta Konsulova-Vazova
 Elisaveta Petrovna
 Elisaveta Ryzih
 Elisaveta Stekolnikowa
 Elisaveta Svilova

See also
 Elizabeth (given name)
 Elizabeth (disambiguation)
 Elizaveta (disambiguation)
 Jelisaveta (disambiguation)